Archaeonycteris is an archaic bat genus whose fossilised remains have been found in Germany, France, England and India.

The genus was established in 1917, when Pierre Revilliod described the material excavated at the Messel Pit as the fossil  species Archaeonycteris trigonodon.

Archaeonycteris trigonodon Revilliod, 1917 - Messel Pit (Lutetian), Germany
Archaeonycteris pollex Storch & Habersetzer, 1988 - Messel Pit (Lutetian), Germany
Archaeonycteris brailloni Russell et al., 1973 - Avenay quarry (Ypresian), France
Archaeonycteris relicta Harrison & Hooker, 2010 - Creechbarrow Limestone Formation, England
Archaeonycteris storchi Smith et al., 2007 - Vastan Lignite Mines (Ypresian), India

A species discovered at the Silveirinha site in Portugal, Archaeonycteris praecursor, was described in 2009 and estimated to be the oldest of the known taxa. The fossil material uncovered in Dorset, England, and described as Archaeonycteris relicta is dated to a later period in the Eocene, this is the most recent known species. The only species to found beyond Europe is the Early Eocene fossil species Archaeonycteris storchi, which occurs in India.

References

Eocene bats
Eocene mammals of Europe
Eocene mammals of Asia
Prehistoric bat genera
Fossil taxa described in 1917